Mobilia is an automobile and road museum located in Kangasala, Finland. The museum is devoted to history of motoring, motor vehicles and road traffic in Finland. Their collections include 6300 museum objects from which 355 objects are vehicles. 

References

External links
 
 

Transport museums in Finland
Automotive museums
Kangasala